George Hawkins may refer to:

 George C. Hawkins (1918–1991), Alabama state legislator
 George Hawkins (athlete) (1883–1917), British Olympic athlete
 George Hawkins (footballer) (1908–1979), Australian rules footballer
 George Hawkins (politician) (born 1946), New Zealand politician
 George Hawkins (EastEnders), a character from the British TV soap-opera EastEnders
 George S. Hawkins (lawyer), American lawyer, college professor and environmentalist
 George Sydney Hawkins (1808–1878), US Representative from Florida
 George Hawkins Williams, American politician, 1882 president of the Maryland Senate